Cassandra Rios, the alias of Odete Rios (1932, São Paulo — March 8, 2002) was a Brazilian fiction, mystery and specially lesbian erotica books writer. She wrote more than 40 novels, and was the first Brazilian female writer who sold more than one million books. She was censored during the military dictatorship.

Her parents were Spanish outcasts from Spanish Civil war.

Partial bibliography 
 Volúpia do Pecado
 Carne em delírio
 Nicoletta Ninfeta
 Crime de Honra
 Uma Mulher Diferente
 Copacabana Posto 6 - A madrasta
 A Lua Escondida
 O Gamo e a Gazela
 A Borboleta Branca
 As Traças
 A Tara
 O Prazer de Pecar
 Tessa, a Gata
 A Paranoica
 Breve História de Fábia
 Um Escorpião na Balança
 Muros Altos

References

External links 
  TPM

1932 births
2002 deaths
Brazilian erotica writers
Brazilian people of Spanish descent
Brazilian women novelists
Lesbian novelists
Brazilian lesbian writers
Brazilian LGBT novelists
Women erotica writers
20th-century Brazilian LGBT people